Kuncho Kunchev (born 27 June 1983) is a Bulgarian footballer, currently playing for Spartak Pleven as a midfielder.

Kunchev previously played for Cherno More Varna and Spartak Varna in the Bulgarian A PFG.

References

External links
Profile at footmercato.net
Guardian's Stats Centre

1983 births
Living people
Bulgarian footballers
First Professional Football League (Bulgaria) players
PFC Spartak Pleven players
PFC Cherno More Varna players
PFC Spartak Varna players
Expatriate footballers in Romania

Association football midfielders